Oliva sidelia, common name the pretty olive, is a species of sea snail, a marine gastropod mollusk in the family Olividae, the olives.

Description
The length of the shell varies between 14 mm and 23 mm

Distribution
This marine species occurs in the Bay of Bengal; off Philippines, New Guinea and Fiji.

References

 Kilburn, R.N. (1980). The genus Oliva (Mollusca: Gastropoda: Olividae) in southern Africa and Mozambique. Annals of the Natal Museum. 24(1): 221–231. page(s): 224.; note: Material discussed - Oliva todosina
 Vervaet F.L.J. (2018). The living Olividae species as described by Pierre-Louis Duclos. Vita Malacologica. 17: 1-111

External links
 Marrat, F. P. 1867. On some new species of Oliva, and a new Trivia. Annals and Magazine of Natural History (3)20: 213-215
 MNHN, Paris: syntype

sidelia
Gastropods described in 1840